Word sync is a technique for synchronizing digital audio signals between high-end professional devices, such as CD players, audio I/O cards, etc. It allows all the components in the signal path to process the data and remain synchronized with each other.

Crucial to the operation of simultaneous audio systems, Word sync and other forms of audio synchronization are critical in maintaining timing consistency between different streams of audio data. 

For standard audio equipment, minute differences in tempo or timing related to multiple sources of audio may appear unnoticeable to the ear in practice, but when isolated in an audio editing environment, or operating within a complex and multifaceted audio system, it can quickly become 'muddy' or reduce the quality of the output.

E.g.

One drummer is beating out a pattern 10110. But if two or three drummers are also beating that same 10110 pattern but do not all start at exactly the same point in time, or keep exactly the same tempo as they are doing it, leads to a very 'muddy' message.

See also
Syncword
Musical tuning

References

Digital audio